Mary Esther Wells (May 13, 1943 – July 26, 1992) was an American singer, who helped to define the emerging sound of Motown in the early 1960s.

Along with The Supremes, The Miracles, The Temptations, Martha Reeves and the Vandellas, and the Four Tops, Wells was said to have been part of the charge in black music onto radio stations and record shelves of mainstream America, "bridging the color lines in music at the time."

With a string of hit singles composed mainly by Smokey Robinson, including "The One Who Really Loves You", "Two Lovers", and the Grammy-nominated "You Beat Me to the Punch", all in 1962, plus her signature hit, "My Guy" (1964), she became recognized as "The Queen of Motown" until her departure from the company in 1964, at the height of her success.

Life and career

Early life and initial recordings
Mary Esther Wells was born near Detroit's Wayne State University on May 13, 1943, to a mother who worked as a domestic, and an absentee father. One of three children, she contracted spinal meningitis at the age of two and struggled with partial blindness, deafness in one ear and temporary paralysis. At age 10, Wells contracted tuberculosis. During her early years, Wells lived in Black Bottom and struggled with poverty. By age 12, she was helping her mother with house cleaning work. She described the ordeal years later:

Wells used singing as her comfort from her pain and by age 10 had graduated from church choirs to performing at local nightclubs in the Detroit area. Wells graduated from Detroit's Northwestern High School at the age of 17 and set her sights on becoming a scientist, but after hearing about the success of Detroit musicians such as Jackie Wilson and the Miracles, she decided to try her hand at music as a singer-songwriter.

In 1960, 17-year-old Wells approached Tamla Records founder Berry Gordy at Detroit's Twenty Grand club, with a song she had intended for Jackie Wilson to record, since Wells knew of Gordy's collaboration with Wilson. However, a tired Gordy insisted Wells sing the song in front of him. Impressed, Gordy had Wells enter Detroit's United Sound Systems to record the single, titled "Bye Bye Baby". After a reported 22 takes, Gordy signed Wells to the Motown subsidiary of his expanding record label and released the song as a single in September 1960; it peaked at number 8 on the US Billboard R&B chart in 1961, and later crossed over to the pop singles chart, where it peaked at number 45.

Wells' early Motown recordings reflected a rougher R&B sound than the smoother style of her biggest hits. Wells became the first Motown female artist to have a Top 40 pop single after the Mickey Stevenson-penned doo-wop song "I Don't Want to Take a Chance" hit number 33 in June 1961. In the fall of that year, Motown issued her first album and released a third single, the bluesy ballad "Strange Love". When that record bombed, Gordy set Wells up with the Miracles' lead singer Smokey Robinson. Though she was hailed as "the first lady of Motown", Wells was technically Motown's third female signed act: Claudette Rogers, of Motown's first star group the Miracles, has been referred to by Berry Gordy as "the first lady of Motown Records" due to her being signed as a member of the group, and in late 1959 Detroit blues-gospel singer Mable John had signed to the then-fledgling label a year prior to Wells' arrival. Nevertheless, Wells' early hits as one of the label's few female solo acts did make her the label's first female star and its first fully successful solo artist.

Success
Wells's teaming with Robinson led to a succession of hit singles over the following two years. Their first collaboration, 1962's "The One Who Really Loves You", was Wells's first hit, peaking at number 2 on the R&B chart and number 8 on the Hot 100. The song featured a calypso-styled soul production that defined Wells's early hits. Motown released the similar-sounding "You Beat Me to the Punch" a few months later. The song became her first R&B number 1 single and peaked at number 9 on the pop chart. The success of "You Beat Me to the Punch" helped to make Wells the first Motown star to be nominated for a Grammy Award when the song was nominated for Best Rock & Roll Recording in 1963.

In late 1962, "Two Lovers" became Wells's third consecutive single to hit the Top 10 of Billboards Hot 100, peaking at number 7 and becoming her second number 1 hit on the R&B chart. This helped to make Wells the first female solo artist to have three consecutive Top 10 singles on the pop chart. The track sold over one million copies, and was awarded a gold disc. Wells's success at the label was recognized when she became a headliner during the first string of Motortown Revue concerts, starting in the fall of 1962. The singer showcased a rawer stage presence that contrasted with her softer R&B recordings.

Wells's success continued in 1963 when she hit the Top 20 with the doo-wop ballad "Laughing Boy" and scored three additional Top 40 singles, "Your Old Standby", "You Lost the Sweetest Boy", and its B-side, "What's Easy for Two Is So Hard for One".  "You Lost the Sweetest Boy" was one of the first hit singles composed by Holland–Dozier–Holland, the songwriting and producing team, though Robinson remained Wells's primary producer.

Also in 1963, Wells recorded a session of successful B-sides that arguably became as well known as her hits, including "Operator", "What Love Has Joined Together", "Two Wrongs Don't Make a Right" and "Old Love (Let's Try It Again)". Wells and Robinson also recorded a duet titled "I Want You 'Round", which would be re-recorded by Marvin Gaye and Kim Weston.

In 1964, Wells recorded "My Guy". The Smokey Robinson song became her trademark single, reaching number 1 on the Cashbox R&B chart for seven weeks and becoming the number 1 R&B single of the year. The song successfully crossed over to the Billboard Hot 100, where it eventually replaced Louis Armstrong's "Hello, Dolly!" at number 1, remaining there for two weeks. The song became Wells's second million-selling single.
 
To build on the song's success, Motown released a duet album recorded with fellow Motown singing star Marvin Gaye, Together. The album peaked at number 1 on the R&B album chart and number 42 on the pop album chart, and yielded the double-sided hits "Once Upon a Time" and "What's the Matter With You Baby".

"My Guy" was one of the first Motown songs to break on the other side of the Atlantic, eventually peaking at number 5 on the UK chart and making Wells an international star. Around this time, the Beatles stated that Wells was their favorite American singer, and soon she was given an invitation to open for the group during their tour of the United Kingdom, thus making her the first Motown star to perform in the UK. Wells was only one of three female singers to open for the Beatles, the others being Brenda Holloway and Jackie DeShannon. Danny Tyrell accompanied her in live shows in Detroit. Wells made friends with all four Beatles and later released a tribute album, Love Songs to the Beatles, in mid-decade.

Former Motown sales chief Barney Ales described Wells's landmark success in 1964:

Leaving Motown

Ironically during her most successful year, Wells was having problems with Motown over her original recording contract, which she had signed at the age of 17. She was also reportedly angry that the money made from "My Guy" was being used to promote The Supremes, who had found success with "Where Did Our Love Go", just as "My Guy" was promoted, using the profits from another, earlier hit Motown song. Though Gordy reportedly attempted to renegotiate with Wells, the singer still asked to be freed from her contract with Motown.

A pending lawsuit kept Wells away from the studio for several months, as she and Gordy brokered the contract details, with Wells fighting to gain a larger share of the royalties she had earned during her tenure with Motown. Finally, Wells invoked a clause that allowed her to leave the label, advising the court that her original contract was invalid, as she had signed while she was still a minor. Wells won her lawsuit and was awarded a settlement, leaving Motown officially in early 1965, whereupon she accepted a lucrative ($200,000) contract with 20th Century Fox Records.

Part of the terms of the agreement of her release was that she could not receive any royalties from her past works with the label, including use of her likeness to promote herself.

Career struggles
Wells worked on material for her new record label while dealing with other issues, including being bedridden for weeks suffering from tuberculosis. Wells's eponymous first 20th Century Fox release included the first single "Ain't It The Truth", its B-side "Stop Taking Me for Granted", the lone top 40 hit, "Use Your Head" and "Never, Never Leave Me". However, the album flopped, as did the Beatles tribute album she released not too long afterwards. Rumors have hinted Motown may have threatened to sue radio stations for playing Wells's post-Motown music during this time. After a stressful period in which Wells and the label battled over multiple issues after her records failed to chart successfully, the singer asked to be let go in 1965 and left with a small settlement.

In 1966, Wells signed with Atlantic Records' subsidiary Atco. Working with producer Carl Davis, she scored her final Top 10 R&B hit with "Dear Lover", which also became a modestly successful pop hit, peaking at number 51. However, much like her tenure with 20th Century Fox, the singer struggled to come up with a follow-up hit, and in 1968, she left the label for Jubilee Records, where she scored her final pop hit, "The Doctor", a song she co-wrote with then-husband Cecil Womack. Meanwhile, she had attempted to develop a film career, but only managed a guest starring role in 1967's Catalina Caper (1967). In 1970, Wells left Jubilee for a short-lived deal with Warner Music subsidiary Reprise Records and released two Bobby Womack-produced singles. In 1972, Wells scored a UK hit with a re-issue of "My Guy", which was released on the Tamla-Motown label and climbed to number 14. Though a re-issue, Wells promoted the single heavily and appeared on the British TV show Top of the Pops for the first time. Despite this mini-revival, she decided to retire from music in 1974 to raise her family.

Comeback
In 1977, Wells divorced Cecil Womack and returned to performing. She was spotted by CBS Urban president Larkin Arnold in 1978 and offered a contract with the CBS subsidiary Epic Records, which released In and Out of Love in October 1981. The album, which had been recorded in 1979, yielded Wells's biggest hit in years, the funky disco single, "Gigolo".

"Gigolo" became a smash at dance clubs across the country. A six-minute mix hit number 13 on Billboards Hot Dance/Club Singles chart and number 2 on the Hot Disco Songs chart. A four-minute radio version released to R&B stations in January 1982 achieved a modest showing at number 69. It turned out to be Wells's final chart single.

After the parent album failed to chart or produce successful follow-ups, the Motown-styled These Arms was released, but it flopped and was quickly withdrawn, and Wells's Epic contract fizzled. The album's failure may have been due to light promotion. She still had one more album in her CBS contract, and in 1982, released an album of cover songs, Easy Touch, which aimed for the adult contemporary radio format.

Leaving CBS in 1983, she continued recording for smaller labels, gaining new success as a touring performer.

On the April 21, 1984 edition of American Top 40, Casey Kasem reported that Wells was attempting to establish a hot dog chain.

In 1989, Wells was celebrated with a Pioneer Award from the Rhythm and Blues Foundation during its inaugural year.

Final years
In 1990, Wells recorded an album for Ian Levine's Motorcity Records, but her voice began to fail, causing the singer to visit a local hospital. Doctors diagnosed Wells with laryngeal cancer. Treatments for the disease ravaged her voice, forcing her to quit her music career. Since she had no health insurance, her illness wiped out her finances, forcing her to sell her home. As she struggled to continue treatment, old Motown friends, including Diana Ross, Mary Wilson, members of the Temptations and Martha Reeves, made donations to support her, along with the help of admirers such as Dionne Warwick, Rod Stewart, Bruce Springsteen, Aretha Franklin and Bonnie Raitt. That same year, a benefit concert was held by fellow fan and Detroit R&B singer Anita Baker. Wells was also given a tribute by friends such as Stevie Wonder and Little Richard on The Joan Rivers Show.

In 1991, Wells brought a multimillion-dollar lawsuit against Motown for royalties she felt she had not received upon leaving Motown Records in 1964 and for loss of royalties for not promoting her songs as the company should have. Motown eventually settled the lawsuit by giving her a six-figure sum. That same year, she testified before the United States Congress to encourage government funding for cancer research:

Personal life
Wells married twice: first, in 1960, to Detroit singer Herman Griffin; they divorced in 1963. Despite rumors, she never dated fellow Motown singer Marvin Gaye, who would go on to have successful duet partnerships with Kim Weston, Tammi Terrell and Diana Ross after Wells had left Motown.

In 1966, Wells married singer-songwriter Cecil Womack, formerly of the Valentinos, and the younger brother of musician Bobby Womack. The marriage lasted until 1977 and they produced three children. 

Wells had four children from two marriages: Cecil, Jr., Harry, Stacy, and Sugar.

Death
In the summer of 1992, Wells's cancer returned and she was rushed to the Kenneth Norris Jr. Cancer Hospital in Los Angeles with pneumonia. With the effects of her unsuccessful treatments and a weakened immune system, Wells died on July 26, 1992, at the age of 49. After her funeral, which included a eulogy given by her old friend and former collaborator, Smokey Robinson, Wells was cremated, and her ashes were laid to rest in Glendale's Forest Lawn Memorial Park, in a Womack family crypt.

Accolades
Though Wells has been eligible for induction to the Rock and Roll Hall of Fame, being nominated twice in 1986 and 1987, she has yet to achieve it.

Wells earned one Grammy Award nomination during her career. Her song "My Guy" was inducted into the Grammy Hall of Fame in 1999.

Wells was given one of the first Pioneer Awards by the Rhythm and Blues Foundation in 1989. A year later, the foundation raised more than $50,000 to help with her treatment after her illness had wiped out all of her finances.

Wells was inducted into the Michigan Rock and Roll Legends Hall of Fame in 2006. She was inducted into the National Rhythm & Blues Hall of Fame in 2017.

Discography

Singles
1960: "Bye Bye Baby" (US #45)
1961: "I Don't Want to Take a Chance" (US #33)
1962: "The One Who Really Loves You" (US #8)
1962: "You Beat Me to the Punch" (US #9)
1962: "Two Lovers" (US #7)
1963: "Laughing Boy" (US #15)
1963: "Your Old Standby" (US #40)
1963: "You Lost the Sweetest Boy" (US #22)
1963: "What's So Easy for Two Is So Hard for One" (US #29)
1964: "My Guy" (US #1, UK #5)
1964: "Once Upon a Time" (US #19)
1964: "What's the Matter with You Baby" (US #15)
1964: "Ain't It The Truth (US #45)
1964: "Stop Takin’ Me For Granted (US #88)
1965: "Use Your Head" (US #34)
1965: "Never, Never Leave Me" (US R&B #15)
1965: "He's A Lover" (US #74)
1965: "Me Without You" (US #95)
1966: "Dear Lover" (US #51, R&B #6)
1966: "Can't You See (You’re Losing Me)"  (US #94)
1966: "Such A Sweet Thing" (US #99)
1968: "The Doctor" (US #65, R&B #22)
1969: "Never Give A Man The World: (US R&B #38)
1969: "Dig the Way I Feel" (US R&B #35)
1981: "Gigolo" (US Disco #2, US Club #13, R&B #69)

Charted albums
1963: Two Lovers and Other Great Hits  (#49 U.S.) 
1964: Together  (#42 U.S.) 
1964: Greatest Hits (#18 U.S.)
1964: Mary Wells Sings My Guy (#111 U.S.)
1965: Mary Wells (#145 U.S.)

References

External links

 
 CMG Worldwide
 History of Rock page on Mary Wells
 
 

1943 births
1992 deaths
20th-century American singers
20th-century American women singers
20th-century African-American women singers
African-American songwriters
American contraltos
American soul singers
American rhythm and blues singers
American women pop singers
Nightclub performers
Singers from Detroit
Songwriters from Michigan
Atlantic Records artists
Epic Records artists
Jubilee Records artists
Motown artists
Northwestern High School (Michigan) alumni
Burials at Forest Lawn Memorial Park (Glendale)
Deaths from cancer in California
Deaths from laryngeal cancer